Vladimir Evgen'evich Zakharov (born August 1, 1939) is a Soviet and Russian mathematician and physicist. He is currently Regents' Professor of mathematics at The University of Arizona, director of the Mathematical Physics Sector at the Lebedev Physical Institute, and is on the committee of the Stefanos Pnevmatikos International Award. Zakharov's research interests cover physical aspects of nonlinear wave theory in plasmas, hydrodynamics, oceanology, geophysics, solid state physics, optics, and general relativity.

Zakharov was awarded the Dirac Medal in 2003 for his contributions to the theory of turbulence, with regard to the exact results and the prediction of inverse cascades, and for "putting the theory of wave turbulence on a firm mathematical ground by finding turbulence spectra as exact solutions and solving the stability problem, and in introducing the notion of inverse and dual cascades in wave turbulence."

Vladimir Zakharov is also a poet. He has published several books of poetry in Russia and his works regularly appear in periodicals. A collection of his poetry in an English translation The Paradise for Clouds was published in the UK in 2009.

Biography
Vladimir Zakharov was born in Kazan, Russian SFSR in 1939, to Evgeniy and Elena Zakharov, an engineer and a schoolteacher. He studied at the Moscow Power Engineering Institute and at the Novosibirsk State University, where he received his specialist degree in physics in 1963 and his Candidate of Sciences degree in 1966, studying under Roald Sagdeev. Vladimir Zakharov is married, he has 3 sons. Also, he writes poems and his works were published in Novy Mir in 1990-s and 2000-s.

Academic career
After completing his Candidate of Science degree, Zakharov worked as a researcher at the Budker Institute of Nuclear Physics in Novosibirsk, where in 1971 he completed his Doctor of Sciences degree. In 1974, Zakharov moved to the Landau Institute for Theoretical Physics in Chernogolovka, where he eventually became director. He was elected as a corresponding member of the
Academy of Sciences of the Soviet Union in 1984 and as a full member in 1991. In 1992, Zakharov became a professor of mathematics at the University of Arizona, and in 2004 he became the director of the Mathematical Physics Sector at the Lebedev Physical Institute.

Awards and honors
State Prize for research in Plasma Theory, USSR, 1987
Order of Honors from the State, USSR, 1989
State Prize of Russian Federation for research in Soliton Theory, Russia, 1993
Order for the Service to Russian federation, awarded to 60th anniversary, 1999
Dirac Medal of the Abdus Salam International Center for Theoretical Physics, Trieste, Italy, 2003
Namesake of asteroid 7153 Vladzakharov
Fellow of the American Mathematical Society, 2012

Selected bibliography
 S. P. Novikov, S. V. Manakov, L. P. Pitaevskii, V. E. Zakharov, Theory of Solitons: The Inverse Scattering Method, Springer-Verlag (1984), 
 V. E. Zakharov, What is Integrability?, Springer-Verlag (1991), 
 V. E. Zakharov, V. S. L'vov, G. Falkovich, Kolmogorov Spectra of Turbulence I: Wave Turbulence, Springer-Verlag (1992), 
 Vladimir Zakharov, The Paradise for Clouds, Ancient Purple Translations (2009),

See also
 Zakharov system
 Zakharov–Schulman system

References

External links

1939 births
Living people
Soviet physicists
20th-century Russian  physicists
Corresponding Members of the USSR Academy of Sciences
Full Members of the Russian Academy of Sciences
Academic staff of the Moscow Institute of Physics and Technology
University of Arizona faculty
Recipients of the USSR State Prize
State Prize of the Russian Federation laureates
Fellows of the American Mathematical Society
Novosibirsk State University alumni
21st-century Russian physicists